The Ixcoy Formation is a geologic formation in Guatemala. It preserves fossils dating back to the Cretaceous period. The upper part of the Ixcoy Formation is laterally equivalent with the Campur Formation of the Petén Basin in northern Guatemala.

Fossil content 
The following fossils have been uncovered from the formation:
 Biradiolites jamaicensis
 Chubbina jamaicensis
 Praeradiolites cf. verseyi
 Senalveolina aubouini
 Thyrastylon adhaerens
 Texicaprina cf. orbiculata
 Chondrodonta sp.
 ?Planocaprina sp.

See also 
 List of fossiliferous stratigraphic units in Guatemala

References

Bibliography 
 
 

Geology of Guatemala
Cretaceous Guatemala
Albian Stage
Aptian Stage
Cenomanian Stage
Turonian Stage
Coniacian Stage
Santonian Stage
Campanian Stage
Maastrichtian Stage
Limestone formations
Shallow marine deposits
Reef deposits
Formations